Mazloom is a 1986 Indian Hindi-language crime drama film directed by C.P. Dixit and produced by Ranjit Virk, starring Suresh Oberoi, Anita Raj and Mandakini in lead roles.

Plot summary
Purnima is raped by a stranger (Shakti Kapoor) in a train and is too ashamed to talk about the incident. She becomes pregnant and her parents find out. Her father (Pinchoo Kapoor) dies of shock upon hearing this. Since it is too late to abort the baby, she gives birth to a baby boy and her mother gives him away to a stranger.

A few days later, Purnima marries Vijay (Suresh Oberoi), but ironically the same child ends up in their care, and they name him Rajan (Arjun).

Years later, Purnima gives birth to another child, named Aman. The two boys grow up, and sibling's rivalry prevails to such an extent that they eventually fall in love with the same woman, Meena (Mandakini). Things become increasingly complicated and one member of their family is killed, and another, arrested.

Cast

Suresh Oberoi as Vijay Singh
Anita Raj as Purnima Singh
Pinchoo Kapoor as Raj Bahadur Arjun Singh (Purnima's father)
Veena as Purnima mother	
Arjun as Rajan Vijay Singh
Aman Virk as Aman Vijay Singh
Mandakini as Meena
Shakti Kapoor as Advocate Rakesh (rapist)
Shobha Khote as Mrs. Khan
Yunus Parvez as Mr. Khan
Rajesh Puri as Sher Ali
Jayshree T. as Mrs. Sher Ali (Laila)
Parikshat Sahni as Judge Jaspal
Heena Kausar as Neelam Jaspal, sister of Vijay Singh
Goga Kapoor as Prosecuting Attorney
Birbal as Clerk

Songs
The songs in the soundtrack are written by S.H. Bihari and Santosh Anand.
"Pyar Ka Farz Nibhane Ke Liye Aaye Hai" - Mohammed Aziz
"Sunday Monday Tuesday Wednesday Thursday" - Anuradha Paudwal, Mohammed Aziz
"Aa Kareeb Aao Na Yun Dor Dor Jao" - Suresh Wadkar
"Aankh Pe Dhoop Ka Chashma Or Sar Par Ghatye Kali" - Shabbir Kumar
"Kal Hamare Ghar Teri Baarat Ayegi, Or Kya Kya Hoga Jab Woh Raat Aaygi" - Anuradha Paudwal, Mohammed Aziz
"Kal Ho Na Ho Jahan Me Ye Chand Ye Sitare" - Suresh Wadkar, Kavita Krishnamurthy

References

External links

1980s Hindi-language films
1986 films
Films scored by Laxmikant–Pyarelal
Indian crime drama films